There are three legislation by the name of the Seditious Meetings Act, all created by the British Parliament.

 Seditious Meetings Act 1795
 Seditious Meetings Act 1817
 Seditious Meetings Act 1819

See also 

 Prevention of Seditious Meetings Act, 1907 - an act of the Imperial Legislative Council, the legislature for British India